Gabriel Araya (born 7 April 1999) is a Chilean swimmer. He competed in the men's 100 metre butterfly event at the 2018 FINA World Swimming Championships (25 m), in Hangzhou, China. In 2019, he competed in two events at the 2019 World Aquatics Championships held in Gwangju, South Korea.

References

External links
 

1999 births
Living people
Chilean male butterfly swimmers
Place of birth missing (living people)
20th-century Chilean people
21st-century Chilean people